Boffzen is an unincorporated area in the German district of Holzminden. It is named after the bordering municipality Boffzen. It is located in the Solling.

References 

Holzminden (district)
Unincorporated areas of Germany